Bobsleigh at the 1984 Winter Olympics was held at the Olympic Bobsleigh and Luge Track on the mountain of Trebević between February 10–18, 1984.

This was the first time that Yugoslavia entered bobsleigh teams, and did so as hosts. Chinese Taipei also entered bob teams for the first time. The two events also saw the Swede, Carl-Erik Eriksson compete in the Games for the sixth time and the age of 53.

The German Democratic Republic dominated events and won Gold & Silver in both disciplines, with Wolfgang Hoppe and Dietmar Schauerhammer winning Golds in both events.

Events

Participating NOCs
Sixteen nations  sent bobsleigh to compete in the events at Sarajevo.

Medal table

References

External links
1984 bobsleigh two-man results
1984 bobsleigh four-man results

 
1984
1984 Winter Olympics events
Olympics
Bobsleigh in Bosnia and Herzegovina